Merle Karusoo (born 1 July 1944 in Rae Parish) is an Estonian stage director and writer. She is also known as a collector of Estonian biographies.

In 1972, she graduated from University of Tartu in Estonian philology. In 1999, she defended her master's thesis in sociology at Tallinn Pedagogical University.

She has worked as a director at the Estonian Drama Theatre and the Estonian State Youth Theater.

Karusoo has worked as a course instructor and lecturer at the Estonian Academy of Music and Theatre and the University of Tartu Viljandi Culture Academy. Since 2014, she has been a Professor of Liberal Arts, teaching at the University of Tartu.

Awards 
 1980 
 1981 Juhan Smuul literary award
 1990 Merited Artist of the ESSR
 2001 Order of the White Star, IV class

Selected works
 1981: play "Ma olen 13-aastane" ('I Am 13')
 1982: play "Meie elulood" ('Our Life Stories')
 1997: play "Kured läinud, kurjad ilmad" ('The Cranes Are Gone, the Weather's Bad')

References

1944 births
Living people
Estonian theatre directors
Estonian dramatists and playwrights
Estonian non-fiction writers
20th-century Estonian women writers
21st-century Estonian women writers
University of Tartu alumni
Tallinn University alumni
20th-century Estonian educators
Academic staff of the Estonian Academy of Music and Theatre
Academic staff of the University of Tartu
Recipients of the Order of the White Star, 5th Class
People from Rae Parish